Galate Aliyandru is a 2000 Indian Kannada-language comedy drama film, directed by S. Narayan and produced by Anitha Kumaraswamy. This film stars Shiva Rajkumar, Sakshi Shivanand (in her Kannada debut), S. Narayan and Tara whilst Doddanna and Mukhyamantri Chandru play other pivotal roles.

The original score and soundtrack was composed by Deva for the lyrics of K. Kalyan and S. Narayan. The film is a remake of Tamil hit film Ullathai Allitha (1996) which itself was heavily inspired by the Hindi film Andaz Apna Apna. The film was declared a success upon release.

Cast

 Shiva Rajkumar 
 Sakshi Shivanand 
 S. Narayan 
 Tara 
 Doddanna 
 Mukhyamantri Chandru
 Arun Pandiyan
 Tennis Krishna
 Shobharaj
 Karibasavaiah
 Mandeep Roy
 Deepti Bhatnagar

Soundtrack
The music was composed by Deva. The songs "Sagariye Sagariye" and "Laila Laila" became hits.

References

2000 films
2000 comedy-drama films
2000s Kannada-language films
Kannada remakes of Tamil films
Indian comedy-drama films
Films scored by Deva (composer)
Films directed by S. Narayan
Kannada remakes of Hindi films